The FIFA World Cup, sometimes called the Football World Cup or the Soccer World Cup, but usually referred to simply as the World Cup, is an international association football competition contested by the men's national teams of the members of Fédération Internationale de Football Association (FIFA), the sport's global governing body. The championship has been awarded every four years since the first tournament in 1930, except in 1942 and 1946, due to World War II.

The tournament consists of two parts, the qualification phase and the final phase (officially called the World Cup Finals). The qualification phase, which currently take place over the three years preceding the Finals, is used to determine which teams qualify for the Finals.
The UAE have appeared in the finals of the FIFA World Cup on one occasion in 1990 where they lost all three games.

Overall record

''* Denotes draws include knockout matches decided via penalty shoot-out.

Record by Opponent

1990 FIFA World Cup

UAE vs Colombia

West Germany vs UAE
Ismaïl Mubarak got the only goal for the UAE in the first minute of the second half when he latched onto a ball in the box after a mistake by a German defender and hit a low left footed shot into the net.

Yugoslavia vs UAE
Thani Jumaa got the only goal for the UAE in the 22nd minute when he headed home from six yards after a cross from the left.

Record players

Nine players have been fielded on all three occasions, making them record World Cup players for their country. Among them are twin brothers Eissa and Ibrahim Meer.

Top goalscorers

Two UAE players scored one goal each at the 1990 World Cup.

References

United Arab Emirates at FIFA

 
Countries at the FIFA World Cup
FIFA